Knut Fredrik Söderwall (1 January 1842 – 30 May 1924) was a Swedish philologist, professor at Lund University, and member of the Swedish Academy.

Biography
Söderwall was born 1842 in Drängsered parish, Halland County. He was the son of the parish priest Per Söderwall and Margareta Johanna von Wachenfeldt. He graduated from the Lund Cathedral School in 1858, and entered Lund University. Söderwall received a Bachelor of Arts in 1863 and a PhD in 1865. He was appointed Docent 1865 and Adjunct professor in 1872. After six years as a stand-in (extraordinarie professor) for Theodor Wisén he became professor in Nordic languages in 1892. The same year he was also elected to Seat No. 5 of the Swedish Academy, also there as successor to Wisén. Söderwall retired as professor in 1907. He died in Lund 30 May 1924.

Work
Söderwall's work mainly concerns Old Swedish. Between 1884 and 1918 he published a dictionary on Old Swedish, Ordbok öfver svenska medeltidsspråket, on behalf of Svenska fornskriftsällskapet. Following the success in the early work on this dictionary he was recruited by the Swedish Academy to work on Svenska Akademiens Ordbok (SAOB). The work on this dictionary had stalled in the 18th century, but was restarted in the 1880s. Söderwall worked on SAOB 1884–1912. Between 1892 and 1912 he was the main editor.

Memberships in academies and learned societies
1884 Royal Nordic Society of Antiquaries
1892 Swedish Academy
1894 Royal Danish Academy of Sciences and Letters (No. 353)
1895 Bavarian Academy of Sciences and Humanities
1900 Royal Swedish Academy of Sciences (No. 694)
1901 Royal Society of Sciences and Letters in Gothenburg
1909 Royal Swedish Academy of Letters, History and Antiquities (No. 104)

Awards
1868 Svenska Akademiens andra pris from the Swedish Academy
1886 Karl Johan prize from the Swedish Academy
1888 Letterstedt prize from the Royal Swedish Academy of Sciences

Bibliography
 1865 Några anmärkningar öfver de svenska kasusformerna under medeltiden
 1865 Om verbets rektion i fornsvenskan
 1967 Om främmande ords behandling i fornsvenskan
 1870 Hufvudepokerna af svenska språkets utbildning
 1880 Några svenska medeltidsord förklarade
 1884-1918 Ordbok öfver svenska medeltidsspråket

References

External links
Short biography in the member register of the Swedish Academy (in Swedish)
Söderwall on Project Runeberg

1842 births
1924 deaths
Members of the Bavarian Academy of Sciences
Members of the Royal Danish Academy of Sciences and Letters
Members of the Royal Society of Sciences and Letters in Gothenburg
Members of the Royal Swedish Academy of Letters, History and Antiquities
Members of the Royal Swedish Academy of Sciences
Members of the Swedish Academy
Swedish philologists
Swedish lexicographers
Linguists from Sweden
Lund University alumni
Academic staff of Lund University